William Anthony Roman (born October 11, 1938) is a retired Major League Baseball player who was a first baseman and pinch hitter during portions of the  and  seasons for the Detroit Tigers. He threw and batted left-handed.

Roman hit a home run in his first Major League at bat, as a pinch hitter on September 30, 1964, against Jim Bouton of the New York Yankees. Although a standout hitter (.290) in minor league baseball over six seasons between 1960 and 1965, Roman collected only five total hits in 35 at-bats during his two trials for the Tigers.

See also
List of players with a home run in first major league at bat

External links

1938 births
Living people
Baseball players from Detroit
Birmingham Barons players
Cooley High School alumni
Denver Bears players
Detroit Tigers players
Durham Bulls players
Knoxville Smokies players
Major League Baseball first basemen
Michigan Wolverines baseball players
Syracuse Chiefs players
Toledo Mud Hens players